Jaan may refer to:

Jaan (given name)
Jaan (album), an Indian pop album by Sonu Nigam
Jaan (film), a 1996 Bollywood action film directed by Raj Kanwar
Gauhar Jaan (1873–1930), Indian singer and dancer
"Jaan Atki", a 2016 Punjabi song by Mumzy Stranger

de:Jaan